The Drama Desk Award for Outstanding Revival of a Musical is an annual award presented by Drama Desk in recognition of achievements in the theatre among Broadway, Off Broadway and Off-Off Broadway productions. The category was created in the 1994 ceremony and became a recurring award in the following years.

Winners and nominees

1990s

2000s

2010s

2020s

See also
 Laurence Olivier Award for Best Musical Revival
 Tony Award for Best Revival of a Musical

References

External links
 Drama Desk official website

Musical Revival